André-Paul Antoine (1892–1982) was a French screenwriter. He also directed two films and a documentary during the early 1930s.

Selected filmography
 The Mysteries of Paris (1922)
 Le Miracle des loups (1924)
 My Heart Incognito (1931)
 Return to Paradise (1935)
 Koenigsmark (1935)
 The Lafarge Case (1938)
 Crossroads (1938)
 Immediate Call (1939)
 Savage Brigade (1939)
 There's No Tomorrow (1939)
 The Marvelous Night (1940)
 The Emigrant (1940)
 Sarajevo (1940)
 Pierre and Jean (1943)
 The White Truck (1943)
 The Black Cavalier (1945)
 Star Without Light (1946)
 The Temptation of Barbizon (1946)
 The Three Cousins (1947)
 The Lost Village (1947)
 Bed for Two; Rendezvous with Luck (1950)
 Bluebeard (1951)
 Dakota 308 (1951)
 Sins of Madeleine (1951)
 The Nude Dancer (1952)
 Alarm in Morocco (1953)
 French Cancan (1954)

References

Bibliography
 Klossner, Michael. The Europe of 1500-1815 on Film and Television: A Worldwide Filmography of Over 2550 Works, 1895 Through 2000. McFarland, 2002.

External links

1892 births
1982 deaths
20th-century French screenwriters
Film directors from Paris